The 1954–55 Irish Cup was the 75th edition of Northern Ireland's premier football knock-out cup competition. It began on 5 February 1955, and concluded on 23 April with the final.

The trophy was won by junior side Dundela, who pulled off one of the biggest shocks in Irish Cup history by defeating Irish League side Glenavon in the final, who had already won three senior trophies that season: the City Cup, Gold Cup and Ulster Cup. The defending champions were Derry City, who were defeated 3-2 in the first round by Linfield.

Results

First round

|}

Replay

|}

Quarter-finals

|}

Replay

|}

Second replay

|}

Semi-finals

|}

Final

References

Irish Cup seasons
1954–55 in Northern Ireland association football
1954–55 domestic association football cups